Bumpers Drive-In of America (more commonly referred to as Bumpers), is a regional fast food restaurant chain located in Mississippi and Tennessee. The chain mostly operates in small towns.

History
Bumpers Drive In was founded in 1983, in Brookhaven, Mississippi by Delta State University professor S.L. Sethi. During the late 1970s, Sethi owned a Sonic franchise. Fast food chains at that time favored procedures that sacrificed quality in the name of variety and efficiency. Frozen hamburger patties and powdered milk shake bases were commonplace. The entire industry experienced unprecedented growth. Wanting to serve high quality fresh food, Sethi opened his first Bumpers store in Brookhaven.

See also 
 List of hamburger restaurants

References

External links

Fast-food chains of the United States
Fast-food hamburger restaurants
Privately held companies based in Mississippi
Regional restaurant chains in the United States
American companies established in 1983
1983 establishments in Mississippi
Restaurants established in 1983
Madison County, Mississippi
Restaurants in Mississippi
Food and drink companies based in Mississippi
Mississippi culture